German submarine U-298 was a Type VIIC/41 U-boat of Nazi Germany's Kriegsmarine during World War II.

She was laid down on 23 February 1943 by the Bremer Vulkan company at Bremen-Vegesack as yard number 63. She was launched on 25 October 1943, and commissioned on 1 December with Oberleutnant zur See Ortwin Hensellek in command.

Design
German Type VIIC/41 submarines were preceded by the shorter Type VIIB submarines. U-298 had a displacement of  when at the surface and  while submerged. She had two shafts and two  propellers.

U-298 was fitted with five  torpedo tubes (four fitted at the bow and one at the stern), fourteen torpedoes, one  SK C/35 naval gun, (220 rounds), one  Flak M42 and two  C/30 anti-aircraft guns. The boat had a complement of between forty-four and sixty.

Service history

Hensellek was replaced after only three weeks by Oblt.z.S. Otto Hohmann while U-298 completed the training of her crew while part of the 8th U-boat Flotilla in the Baltic Sea.

In July 1944 U-298 sailed to Bergen, Norway, to join the U-Abwehrschule (U-boat School) where she remained as a training boat, under the command of Oblt.z.S. Heinrich Gehrken, until ordered to surrender on 9 May 1945.

Disposal
U-298 was sailed from Bergen on 30 May 1945, arriving at Loch Ryan, Scotland, on 4 June via Scapa Flow.

See also
 Battle of the Atlantic (1939-1945)

References

Bibliography

External links

German Type VIIC/41 submarines
U-boats commissioned in 1943
Operation Deadlight
1943 ships
World War II submarines of Germany
Ships built in Bremen (state)
U-boats sunk by British warships
U-boats sunk in 1945
Maritime incidents in November 1945